The Taiheiyo evergreen forests is a temperate broadleaf forest ecoregion of Japan.

Geography
It also includes Tsushima Island in the Korea Strait between Kyushu and Korea, and the volcanic Izu Islands off Honshu's southern coast.

The ecoregion is home to Japan's largest cities, including Tokyo, Yokohama, Osaka, and Nagoya.

Climate
The ecoregion has a humid subtropical climate. The influence of the Japan Current creates a humid climate with mild winters and a long growing season, which nurtured evergreen broadleaf forests.

Flora
Laurel forests grew near the coast, and oak forests were predominant inland. At higher elevations, the Taiheiyo evergreen forests yielded to the Taiheiyo montane deciduous forests of the interior.

The forests include a mix of species with origins in temperate and tropical Asia. Species with tropical origins include two species of the conifer Podocarpus, two species of Pittosporum, several species in the laurel family (Machilus, Neolitsea, and Cinnamomum), and the Cycad Cycas revoluta. Trees with origins in temperate Eurasia include species of evergreen oaks and Castanopsis.

Fauna
Native mammals include the Sika deer (Cervus nippon) and Japanese macaque (Macaca fuscata). 

Native birds include the fairy pitta (Pitta nympha) and Japanese night heron (Goraschius goisagi). 

The terrestrial Odaigahara salamander (Hynobius boulengeri) is native to the ecoregion.

Conservation and threats
Most of forests have been converted to agriculture or cities. Remnant areas of forest remain around temples and shrines, on steep slopes, and in gorges. Secondary growth woodlands, called Satoyama, are found on hillsides bordering farmlands.

Protected areas
17% of the ecoregion is in protected areas. Protected areas include Fuji-Hakone-Izu National Park, Ise-Shima National Park, Yoshino-Kumano National Park, Seto Inland Sea National Park, Ashizuri-Uwakai National Park, Kirishima-Kinkowan National Park, Unzen-Amakusa National Park, Saikai National Park, and Suigō-Tsukuba Quasi-National Park.

See also
Biota of Tokyo Imperial Palace

References

External links
 

Ecoregions of Japan

Forests of Japan
Palearctic ecoregions
Temperate broadleaf and mixed forests